Zoramia fragilis is a Cardinalfish from the Indo-West Pacific. It occasionally makes its way into the aquarium trade. It grows to a size of 5.5 cm in length.

References
 

fragilis
Fish described in 1961
Taxa named by J. L. B. Smith